Ward Parkway Center, Ward Parkway Mall, or Ward Parkway Shopping Center is a shopping center located in Kansas City, Missouri on the Kansas/Missouri border line. The location surrounds the area on the North from 85th Terrace to 89th Street on the South and on the West from State Line Road to Ward Parkway on the East. Once a two floor mall with a food court it now has one floor with the first floor enclosed. The mall itself is currently in a redevelopment phase and has been in business since 1959. Former stores Sam Goody, Gap, T.G.I. Friday's, The Limited, and Winstead's. Ward Parkway Center is the location of the first modern movie multiplex, with its original two screens (since renovated and expanded to 14 screens) still operated by AMC Theatres. Originally a tiny two-screen theater located near Montgomery Ward, later expanded to the new complex.

Today
Ward Parkway Center has been updated inside and out with evidence of more foot traffic despite expansion development and some empty storefronts.

Ward Parkway Center is set to develop the former Dillard's site — six years after the department store closed.
Plans currently call for a 31,000-square-foot, U-shaped addition with six restaurant tenants and a pedestrian plaza, all on south end of the center.
The two middle buildings would be 18,000 square feet with smaller tenants on either side. Buildings on the north and south end of the addition would include patios.
Legacy Development, which manages the property and is overseeing the development, is in talks with about a dozen restaurants and is focusing on the best tenant mix of four full-service and two limited-service operations. The tenants will be announced during a groundbreaking ceremony in January (2016). 

Chick-fil-A has a pad site outside of Target fronting State Line Road.

Anchor Tenants 
 Target - replaces Montgomery Ward in a new building at the same location
 AMC Ward Parkway 14 Theatres - renovated with leather seats and bar.

Competition
 Bannister Mall - opened 1980, demolished 2009  
 Country Club Plaza
 Oak Park Mall - opened 1975
 Waldo
 Metcalf South Shopping Center - opened 1967, now empty and awaiting re-development
 Prairie Village Shopping Center
 Independence Center - opened 1974
 Blue Ridge Mall - opened 1957, demolished 2005, replaced with Blue Ridge Crossing at the same site

External links
 Official Website
 Directory Map
 Ward Parkway Center will add 6 more restaurants (11-9-2015)
 Ward Parkway Center's new owners see bright future for revamped mall (12-12-2003)
 Ward Parkway Center may sell (5-9-2003)

References

Shopping malls in Missouri
Shopping malls established in 1959
Economy of Kansas City, Missouri
Buildings and structures in Kansas City, Missouri
1959 establishments in Missouri